Bălăceanu is a commune in Buzău County, Muntenia, Romania. It is composed of a single village, Bălăceanu.

Most of the adult population, about 1800 people, work in agriculture. The village derives its name from a local landlord, Nicolae Bălăceanu, who lived in the early 20th century.

References

Communes in Buzău County
Localities in Muntenia